All That Remains is a crime fiction novel by Patricia Cornwell.  It is the third book of the Dr. Kay Scarpetta series.

A killer is stalking young couples, and the remains of 8 youngsters have been found dead over a couple of years.

The book is closely based on the Colonial Parkway Killer, a suspected serial killer who is thought to have murdered 8 people in Virginia in the 1980s. In real life the cases are still unsolved though, as described in the true crime documentary Lovers’ Lane Murders from 2021. As Cornwell's novel made many believe that the Colonial Parkway murders had been solved,<ref>[https://www.dailypress.com/entertainment/books/dp-nws-colonial-parkway-book-0804-20170803-story.html Mike Holtzclaw: Father-daughter authors hope their new book will help solve the murders, Daily Press]</ref> father-daughter true crime authors Blaine Pardoe and Victoria Hester issued their book A special kind of evil in 2017, providing new information from the investigations.

Characters
Kay Scarpetta - Chief Medical Examiner.
Benton Wesley - FBI Profiler.
Pete Marino - Detective Lieutenant in the Richmond Police Department.
Abby Turnbull - Washington Post'' reporter.
Mark James - FBI Special Agent, Dr. Scarpetta's ex-lover from law school
Pat Harvey - National Drug Policy Director, mother of one of the victims. 
Steven Spurrier - Murderer of the named victims.

Victims
Dog  Dammit
Jill Harrington and Elizabeth Mott
Bruce Philips and  Judy Roberts
Jim Freeman and Bonnie Smyth
Ben Anderson and Carolyn Bennett
Susan Wilcox and Mike Martin
Deborah Harvey and Frederick Cheney

Notes

External links
 Author's Official Website

1992 American novels
Novels by Patricia Cornwell
Novels set in Richmond, Virginia
American crime novels
Charles Scribner's Sons books